Bidhyanath Pokhrel (9 June 1918 – 25 August 1994) was a Nepali poet and politician. He was an anti-Rana democratic politician. He took charge of the Dhankuta Front during the 1951 democratic revolution of Nepal.

Pokhrel died on 25 August 1994 in Kathmandu due to cardiac attack.

References

1918 births
1994 deaths
People from Dhankuta District
Nepalese male poets
Nepalese politicians